Royce Vardy (born 3 May 1980) is an Australian rules footballer who played for Richmond between 2000 and 2003.

He was drafted in the 2000 Rookie Draft with the 21st selection from the Devon-Welshpool-Won Wron-Woodside Football Club in the Alberton Football League.  He played 34 games in four seasons at the Tigers before he was delisted at the end of the 2003 season.

In December 2001 he was charged with drink driving, which resulted in his club's major sponsor, the Transport Accident Commission, threatening to reduce it sponsorship of the club.

He is the second cousin of Geelong's Nathan Vardy.

References

External links

Living people
1980 births
Richmond Football Club players
Australian rules footballers from South Australia